Plague, Poverty and Prayer is an exhibition developed by the Horrible Histories franchise.

The exhibition went on display in 2013 at Barley Hall in York, England, a property belonging to the York Archaeological Trust.
Terry Deary, the man behind Horrible Histories, had previously shown an interest in York, publishing a "gruesome guide" to the city in 2010.
Exhibits at Barley Hall included the skeleton of a leper which had been excavated in York.

Theatrical version
Terry Deary was involved in a play with the same title which was previewed in the Scottish press.

References

History of medicine in the United Kingdom
Horrible Histories exhibitions
Horrible Histories live events